Laze pri Gobniku is a settlement west of Gabrovka in the Municipality of Litija in central Slovenia. The area is part of the traditional region of Lower Carniola. It is now included with the rest of the municipality in the Central Sava Statistical Region.

Cirkna Manor
Cirkna Manor is a small isolated early-17th-century mansion located at Laze pri Gobniku no. 6 in the hamlet of Cerkno south of the main settlement. It is a two-story rectangular structure with six windows on the long sides and four on the short sides. The central part of the facade projects from the building, with a stone door casing and two niches on the ground floor, and pilasters on the upper floor.

References

External links
Laze pri Gobniku on Geopedia

Populated places in the Municipality of Litija